Patricio Rubina (born 22 June 1981) is a Chilean former footballer who played as a midfielder.

Honours

Player
Deportes Antofagasta
Primera B (1): 2011 Apertura

External links
 
 

1981 births
Living people
Chilean footballers
Cobreloa footballers
Deportes La Serena footballers
C.D. Antofagasta footballers
Universidad de Concepción footballers
Chilean Primera División players
Primera B de Chile players
Association football midfielders
People from La Serena